Kotigobba 3 is a 2021 Indian Kannada-language action thriller film directed by Shiva Karthik. The film features Sudeepa and Madonna Sebastian marking the latter's debut in Kannada cinema, in lead roles with Nawab Shah as the main antagonist along with Shraddha Das, Aftab Shivdasani and P. Ravi Shankar in prominent roles. It is a standalone sequel to the 2016 film  Kotigobba 2, with Sudeepa and Ravi Shankar reprising their roles from the previous film. 

The film was released in theatres on October 15, 2021 and became a commercial success at the box office.

Plot
The plot follows the events after Kotigobba 2. Satya/Shiva helps the cops bust some criminals where he steals their accounted black money and also runs an orphanage for the downtrodden people. A girl named Jaanu in his orphanage suffers from Brugada Syndrome, so they head to Warsaw for treatment. Satya meets Dr.Priya and through Jaanu, they become friends. In Warsaw, Devendra is a chairman of paramedics research and crime boss who wants to spread a virus and provide a cure to it at a high price to obtain profits. He had bought a Crown Jewel which is kept in the Aircraft Museum and would be delivered to him in a week. 

After consulting the doctor and scheduling a date for the operation, Satya and Jaanu visit the aircraft museum. After they are done visiting, A masked man Ghost carries out heist of the Crown Jewel. The Chase occurs between Interpol officers and Ghost where the former escapes. Satya and Jaanu fly back to Bengaluru. Interpol Officers Sharath and Kangana began their investigation, they check the CCTV footage and the photo of the masked man Ghost is a doppelganger of Satya,  and he is seen reciting a Sanskrit mantra during the heists and  explosions were in a bid to distract Interpol. They head to Bangalore to investigate. Ex-ACP Kishore reveals about his and Satya's past. Devendra learns about Satya and assigns his top assassin Michael to finish him and bring the Jewel back, but Satya kills the henchman and Michael. Sharath and Kangana arrive and arrest Satya.

They interrogate him where he fakingly accepts the blame and also lies that Kishore was the one who planned it. Priya is heartbroken to know about Satya's scams, where she takes Jaanu along with her to Poland for treatment. Sharath and his team take Satya and Kishore to Poland where they are taken to the prison from the airport. However, they escape and reach the hospital where Jaanu was admitted. Anantha Krishna, a surgeon tries to inject chloroform into Satya, but Satya injects him back and convinces Priya and Kishore about his innocence and also reveals Anantha Krishna's involvement in Ghost's criminal activities. He also brings the doctor's phone which receive a message from Ghost telling him to meet him at the pub. They reach the pub where they realize the errors. The Interpol arrives to arrest them, but Ghost distracts them and takes the gang to his hideout where they meet Dr.Anantha Krishna and Ghost. Dr.Anantha Krishna reveals that Ghost is actually Shiva and he is Satya's twin brother and Anantha Krishna is their uncle. 

Past: Shiva and Satya's mother Durga, who is the Commissioned Health Department officer (H.D.O), learns and objects Devendra's methods of spreading the virus and inventing medicines to cure them for profits. Durga is the one who taught the mantra to her children (which was used by Ghost/Shiva before). When both of them are born, Satya is healthy, but Shiva is wounded due to nerve damages, since he defended Satya in the womb from Devendra. Their father Prakash, who is abroad on a business trip arrives to take them. However, Anantha Krishna only gives Satya and he takes Shiva to an ashram and was cured, then Anantha Krishna took him to Poland for higher studies. After that when Shiva learns of the incident and decide to avenge their mother's death and also learn about Satya. He operated a plan to bring him to Poland to divulge the truth. 

Present: Devendra's son Jeet kidnaps Jaanu from the hospital, but Shiva planted a tracker in Jaanu's hospital bed. Satya saves Jaanu and destroys the oxygen tank in the ambulance, causing the ambulance to explode, killing Jeet. Shiva a.k.a Ghost are taken by the Interpol. However, they are kidnapped by Devendra's henchmen. Shiva reveals himself to Devendra and kills him and his associates where he pins the murders on Kishore, who gets arrested. The Interpol officers release Sathya as he is proved innocent and tells the media they are in search of Ghost. Shiva sold the Crown Jewel and used the money by selling it for the uncured patients, who were affected by Devendra's medicine. Satya and Jaanu return to the orphanage. Sharath and Kangana accept the fact that Shiva a.k.a Ghost is not a demon, but a saviour who killed the hidden demon for a definite purpose. Later, Shiva/Ghost resumes his vigilante activities in a far-off place.

Cast

Production
Filming for Kotigobba 3 began in June 2018 in Belgrade. Lead actor Sudeepa rejoined the production in March 2019, after finishing his filming commitments for Pailwaan. The female lead is Madonna Sebastian, marking her debut in Kannada cinema.Kotigobba 3 continued to have a start-stop filming schedule due to Sudeepa's other acting commitments such as the Telugu film Sye Raa Narasimha Reddy, as well as his injury on the film's sets in Hyderabad in August 2019. Parts of the film were shot in other countries including Serbia, Malaysia, Thailand and Poland. The filming was completed in January 2020, after which shooting of song sequences was scheduled in  Puducherry, Mumbai and Bangalore.

Marketing and release
The teaser trailer for the film was removed from YouTube in March 2020 because of a copyright infringement claim, and restored a few days later after recording company Anand Audio filed a return complaint. The film's 30 April 2020 release date was postponed due to the COVID-19 pandemic. The film is scheduled to be released in theaters on 14 October 2021 alongside dubbed versions in Telugu and Hindi with the former version titled Kotikkadu 3. The release of the film was delayed for a day, to 15 October 2021, due to a tiff between the producers and financiers.

Reception

Box office
It was estimated to have collected  in 4 days

Awards
13th Bengaluru International Film Festival :-
Kannada Popular Entertainment - Most Popular Cinema 2021 - 3rd Place Won 

10th South Indian International Movie Awards:-
 SIIMA Award for Best Male Playback Singer – Kannada - for the Song "Pataki Poriyo" - Nominated
 SIIMA Award for Best Female Playback Singer – Kannada - for the Song "Pataki Poriyo" - Nominated
 SIIMA Award for Best Cinematographer – Kannada - Shekhar Chandru - Nominated
 SIIMA Award for Best Comedian – Kannada - P. Ravi Shankar - Nominated

ViKa (Vijaya Karnataka) Web Cinema Awards 2021:-
 Best Actor - Sudeep - Nominated
 Best Film - Nominated
 Best Supporting Actress - Abhirami - Nominated
 Best Comedy Actor - P. Ravi Shankar - Nominated

Soundtrack 
Music is composed by Arjun Janya.

The first track of the film, "Akashane Adarisuva", was released on 27 April 2020 and received more than one million views on YouTube within the first 3 hours 20 minutes.

References

Films shot in Poland
2020s Kannada-language films
2021 films
Films shot in Malaysia
Films shot in Serbia
Films shot in Thailand
2021 action thriller films